Gillisonville Baptist Church is a historic Southern Baptist church on U.S. 278 in Gillisonville, Jasper County, South Carolina.  It was built in 1838, and is in the Greek Revival style.  Notable features include the a portico supported by Doric order columns on pedestals. In February 1865, General William Tecumseh Sherman's troops visited the church and etched "War of 1861-62-63-64. Feb. 1865. This is done by a Yankee Soldier," on the communion silver. The congregation became Gillisonville Baptist Church on November 19, 1885.

It was added to the National Register of Historic Places in 1971.

References

Baptist churches in South Carolina
Churches on the National Register of Historic Places in South Carolina
Churches completed in 1838
19th-century Baptist churches in the United States
Buildings and structures in Jasper County, South Carolina
National Register of Historic Places in Jasper County, South Carolina
Southern Baptist Convention churches